Li Ruigang (born 13 June 1969) is a Chinese businessman and media mogul. He was born in Lanzhou, Gansu province with his ancestral home in Zhongshan, Guangdong province.

Early life and education
Li obtained an MBA from Fudan University and went to Columbia University as a visiting scholar.

Career
Li was president of the Shanghai Media Group from 2002 to 2011.

In 2011, Li was appointed as Deputy Secretary-General of the Shanghai Party Committee and Director of the Municipal Party General Office.

Li is chair of China Media Capital which bought a stake in Manchester City football club. He oversaw a mass media holding company that includes television stations, radio, newspapers, magazines, and Internet ventures. During his tenure revenue for the company expanded six-fold.

Li serves as a non-executive director of WPP.

References

External links
Britannica entry

1969 births
Living people
Fudan University alumni
Chinese corporate directors
Businesspeople from Shanghai